Dan Tomas Pousette (born 9 September 1950) is a Swedish economist.

Biography
He was born in St. Matthew's Parish in Stockholm on 9 September 1950. Pousette joined the government mortgage institution SBAB in 2003 and was its chief economist from 2007 to 2012, after which he started Pousette Ekonomianalys AB. He is the author of a number of publications.

He has been married to Lisa Pousette (born 1951) since 1976.

Selected bibliography
 Pousette, Tomas (1982) (in English). Technology, pricing and investment in telecommunications. Working paper - Industrial Institute for Economic and Social Research, 0280-1914 ; 71. Stockholm. Libris 805129
 Jagrén, Lars; Pousette Thomas (1982). Industrins sårbarhet och flexibilitet. Småtryck från IUI, 0443-0409; 130. Stockholm: Industriens utredningsinstitut. Libris 634280
 Jagrén, Lars; Pousette Thomas (1982). Industriföretagets sårbarhet.  Forskningsrapport / Industriens utredningsinstitut, 0347-7746 ; 15. Stockholm: Industriens utredningsinst. Libris 7622635. ISBN 91-7204-156-0
 Pousette, Tomas (1983) (in English). Monopoly and allocative efficiency with stochastic demand. Working paper - Industrial Institute for Economic and Social Research, 0280-1914 ; 84. Stockholm: IUI. Libris 2448797
 Pousette, Thomas (1983). Datakommunikation i företag. Forskningsrapport / Industriens utredningsinstitut, 0347-7746 ; 24. Stockholm: Industriens utredningsinst. Libris 7622654. ISBN 91-7204-193-5
 Pousette, Thomas (1986). Hur påverkas industrin av ökade elpriser?. Working paper - Industrial Institute for Economic and Social Research, 0280-1914 ; 168. Stockholm: IUI. Libris 2060316
 Pousette, Thomas (1986). Efterfrågan på telefontjänster och telefoner: en ekonometrisk studie; Teletjänster - priser och investeringar. Stockholm. Libris 728088
 Jagrén, Lars; Pousette Thomas (1986). Flexibilitet i företag: en studie av arbetsmarknadskonflikten 1985. Stockholm: Industriens utredningsinstitut (IUI). Libris 7622680. ISBN 91-7204-262-1
 Pousette, Tomas (1987) (in English). Services in industry: an international comparison. Working paper - Industrial Institute for Economic and Social Research, 0280-1914 ; 176. Stockholm: IUI. Libris 688927
 Pousette, Thomas; Nelson Edberg Monica, Olshov Anders (2001). Specialstudie: Mälardalen och Sydvästkusten. Stockholm: Ekonomiska sekretariatet, Nordea. Libris 9141912
 Pousette Thomas, ed (2002). Regional rockad: november 2002. Stockholm: Markets, Nordea. Libris 10441336
 Pousette, Thomas (1976). Efterfrågan på telefontjänster och telefoner: en ekonometrisk studie. Forskningsrapport / Industriens utredningsinstitut, 0347-7746 ; 6. Stockholm: Industriens utredningsinst. Libris 394244. ISBN 91-7204-064-5
 Pousette, Thomas (1978). Teletjänster - priser och investeringar: en samhällsekonomisk studie. Stockholm: Industriens utredningsinstitut. Libris 7622605. ISBN 91-7204-089-0

References

1950 births
Living people
20th-century Swedish people
21st-century Swedish people
Swedish economists
Writers from Stockholm
Swedish people of Walloon descent
Tomas